Sergio Arturo Albarrán Arellano (born October 16, 1979), known as Arturo Albarrán, is a Mexico-born Salvadoran retired professional association football midfielder.

Notes

References

External links
 
 

1979 births
Living people
Association football midfielders
Mexican footballers
Salvadoran footballers
Albinegros de Orizaba footballers
Lagartos de Tabasco footballers
Atlético Mexiquense footballers
Alianza F.C. footballers
C.D. Águila footballers
C.D. Atlético Marte footballers
Club Atlético Zacatepec players
Mexican expatriate footballers
Expatriate footballers in El Salvador
Mexican expatriate sportspeople in El Salvador